Anwar Khan (Urdu: انور خان) (born December 24, 1955, Karachi, Sindh) is a former Pakistani cricketer who played in one Test in 1979. He was a bowling all-rounder. 

He was a match referee in 2008 Pentangular Cup.

References

Khan, Anwar
Khan, Anwar
Pakistan Test cricketers
Pakistani cricketers
Karachi Whites cricketers
Karachi Blues cricketers
National Bank of Pakistan cricketers
Sindh cricketers
Bahawalpur cricketers
Cricketers from Karachi